Scandinavian colonialism is a subdivision within broader colonial studies that discusses the role of Scandinavian nations in achieving economic benefits from outside of their own cultural sphere.  The field ranges from studying the Sami in relation to the Norwegian, Swedish and Finnish states, to activities of the Danish Colonial Empire and Swedish Empire in Africa and on Caribbean islands such as St. Thomas and Saint-Barthélemy. 


Overview

Iceland
Some consider Norse Vikings to be the first Europeans to create colonies in the Americas. The arrival of Leif Erikson, of Iceland, in the Americas occurred 500 years before Christopher Columbus, and it was unintentional, as it was said that his ship was blown off-course on the way to Greenland. Erikson established settlements in what is now modern day Newfoundland, Canada. In the year 999 c. Erikson's father, Erik the Red, was one of the first Europeans to establish colonies in Greenland. Iceland was considered the first European country to create colonies in North America and Greenland.

Finland
Given Finland's historical position between eastern and western colonial powers, Finland never had overseas colonies, and has been colonized at different times by both the Swedish Empire and the Russian Empire. However, Sámi land in Finnish Lapland and Norway's Finnmark region has been colonized by Finns. Beginning in the 14th and 15th centuries, many Finnish settlers migrated to Finnmark from southern districts of Finland, causing much of Finnmark to gradually become more Finnish than Sámi. During the Scandinavian wars in the 18th century, Finnish settlement of Sámi land greatly increased, which the Sámi people regarded as an unwelcome encroachment. Finnish colonization of Sámi land forced Sámi people to retreat further north.

According to the anthology Finnish Colonial Encounters, Finnish people have been able to "claim innocence and non-involvement in European colonialism and colonialist practices" given their own history of being victimized by Swedish and Russian imperialism, a notion the authors refer to as "Finnish exceptionalism". The authors argue that while Finland never had overseas colonies, Finnish people were "undeniably involved in the colonial world, with Finns adopting ideologies and identities that cannot easily be disentangled from colonialism". Like some other European countries that never had overseas colonies, such as Switzerland, Finland is defined as an example of "colonial complicity" and "colonialism without colonies". Despite the absence of overseas colonies, many Finnish migrants participated in colonial projects in Africa and North America. Beginning in the 1890s, Finnish-born settlers operated in the mining industry in the Katanga Province of Belgian Congo.

Many Finns lived in New Sweden, a Swedish colony along the Delaware River that existed between 1638 and 1655 in what is now Delaware, Pennsylvania, New Jersey, and a small portion of Maryland. Although New Sweden was a Swedish colony, ethnic Finns were subjects of the Swedish Empire, and the percentage of Finnish settlers within the colony grew over time. During Swedish rule, Finns composed 22% of the colonial population. Later when the colony came under Dutch rule, the percentage of Finnish colonizers increased to over 50% of the colonial population. Although the Finnish and Swedish settlers of New Sweden were on better terms with the indigenous Susquehannock nation, in contrast to the overtly genocidal actions of the English settlers, there were some defensive attacks against the New Sweden colony by Native Americans.

Finnish settlers, particularly Forest Finns, were culturally important to the early colonization of Appalachia, Idaho, and elsewhere in the United States. Although Finns constituted only a tiny portion of Appalachian settlers, Finnish settlers from New Sweden helped bring northern European woodsman skills such as log cabin construction which formed the basis of backwoods Appalachian material culture.

Greenland
Greenland did not colonize, however, it was colonized by many different Scandinavian countries. Leif Erikson of Iceland was one of the most famous of the settlers of Greenland, and brought Christianity to the country. Greenland was also later colonized by Norway and later Denmark.

Norway

Norwegians controlled the company Société du Madal in Portuguese Mozambique, which owned coconut plantations and a palm oil factory. Société du Madal used the forced labor of indigenous peoples to dig canals and drain swamps around the Zambezi to make way for plantations, in addition to operating the plantations themselves. Child laborers on Madal's properties were paid in rotgut spirits, as was common for many companies operating in Mozambique during the colonial period. Christian Thams, a key founder and major shareholder of the company, had Mozambicans in lands the company controlled pay taxes directly to the company rather than the Portuguese colonial government, a venture sometimes more profitable than agricultural operations. Even after independence, thousands of workers continued to produce coconut oil for Madal into the 21st century.

As an independent state in modern days, Norway occupied Erik the Red's Land on Greenland from 1931 to 1933. Nils Larsen of Sandefjord's expeditions of Antarctica led to Norway's annexation of Bouvet Island in 1927 and Peter I Island in 1929. Norway also maintains sovereignty of Queen Maud Land on Antarctica. Grytviken, the largest settlement on South Georgia and the South Sandwich Islands, was founded by Sandefjordian Carl Anton Larsen in November 1904. Although never Norwegian territories, many settlements throughout the world were established by Norwegians. Examples include the Norwegian Colony in California, Marburg in South Africa, Joinville in Brazil, and Norsewood in New Zealand.

Additional former territorial claims have included South Georgia Island, Fridtjof Nansen Land (1926-1929), Sverdrup Islands (1928-1930), and Inari, Finland (1942-1945).

Sweden
Sweden had colonies in the Americas and in Africa. However, they were not able to hold onto them due to revolts and political purchases. Overall, the Swedish impact on the new world was not as influential as that of the British, Spanish, and Portuguese; however they retained political, cultural, and economic influence over many colonies. Swedish colonies in Africa include: Fort Christiansborg/Fort Frederiksborg (1652-1658), Fort Batenstein (1649-1656), Fort Witsen, (1653-1658), and Carolusberg (1650-1663). Swedish countries in the America's include: Guadeloupe (1813–1814), Saint-Barthélemy (1784–1878), New Sweden (1638–1655), and Tobago (1733). The colony of New Sweden can be seen as an example of Swedish colonization. Now called Delaware, New Sweden stood to make a considerable profit due to tobacco growth. There are still people of Swedish descent remaining in former colonies of Sweden.

Denmark
The Danes colonized many areas including holdings in Africa, the Americas, the Atlantic, and Asia.
The medieval Norwegians colonized much of the Atlantic, including Iceland, Greenland, and the Faroe Islands, which were later inherited as colonies by the united kingdom of Denmark-Norway. However, both of these nations gradually gained independence and are now fully sovereign within the Danish Empire. 
In addition, Denmark also colonized parts of "The Americas", including the Danish West Indies, which was purchased by the United States in 1916, and is now a part of the modern-day U.S. Virgin Islands.
Denmark also had trading posts along the gold coast of Africa and India, starting in the early 17th century, but these were sold to the United Kingdom in the mid 19th century. There are still Africans, North Americans, Latin Americans, Caribbeans, Atlantic, and Asians of Danish ancestry.

See also 
 Danish colonial empire
 Swedish Empire
 Swedish slave trade
 Dano-Norwegian slave trade

External links 
 First Finnish Settlement in America: 1638
First Maps of Delaware, a Swedish Colony in North America
Scandinavian Colonialism and the Rise of Modernity: Small Time Agents in a Global Arena

References 

History of European colonialism
Former Danish colonies
Former Norwegian colonies
Former Swedish colonies
Scandinavian history
History of the Danish colonial empire
History of the Swedish colonial empire